A holy city is a city important to the history or faith of a specific religion. Such cities may also contain at least one headquarters complex (often containing a religious edifice, seminary, shrine, residence of the leading cleric of the religion and/or chambers of the religious leadership's offices) which constitutes a major destination of human traffic, or pilgrimage to the city, especially for major ceremonies and observances. A holy city is a symbolic city, representing attributes beyond its natural characteristics. Marketing experts have suggested that holy cities may be the oldest brands, and more specifically, place brands because they have value added via the perception of religious adherents.

List of holy cities in the world

Africa

Asia

Western and South Asia

Central and East Asia

Southeast Asia

Europe

North America

South America

References

External links